Estádio Cláudio Moacir de Azevedo, also known as Moacyrzão, is a stadium in Macaé. It has a maximum capacity of 16,000 spectators. belonging to Macae Prefecture. It is the home of Macaé Esporte Futebol Clube and Serra Macaense FC.

References

Football venues in Rio de Janeiro (state)
Sports venues in Rio de Janeiro (state)